Viktor Tobiasch is a male former Czech international table tennis player.

He won a silver medal at the 1935 World Table Tennis Championships in the Swaythling Cup (men's team event) with Miloslav Hamr, Stanislav Kolář, Karel Svoboda and Bohumil Váňa for Czechoslovakia.

See also
 List of table tennis players
 List of World Table Tennis Championships medalists

References

Czech male table tennis players
World Table Tennis Championships medalists